The Brunei Postal Services Department is a government department which is responsible for providing postal service in Brunei.

History
Since 1984 the department has been under the control of the Ministry of Communications.
Brunei has been a member of the Universal Postal Union since 15 January 1985.

See also 
Postage stamps and postal history of Brunei

References

External links 
Brunei Post official website.

Postal organizations
Postal system of Brunei
Postal Services Department
Philately of Brunei